John Dick (1788 – April 23, 1824) was a United States district judge of the United States District Court for the District of Louisiana, the United States District Court for the Eastern District of Louisiana and the United States District Court for the Western District of Louisiana.

Education and career

Born in 1788 in County Tyrone, Ireland, Dick read law in 1811. He entered private practice in New Orleans, Louisiana from 1812 to 1815. He was United States Attorney for the Eastern District of Louisiana from 1815 to 1821.

Federal judicial service

Dick was nominated by President James Monroe on March 1, 1821, to a seat on the United States District Court for the District of Louisiana vacated by Judge Dominic Augustin Hall. He was confirmed by the United States Senate on March 2, 1821, and received his commission the same day. Dick was reassigned by operation of law to the United States District Court for the Eastern District of Louisiana and the United States District Court for the Western District of Louisiana on March 3, 1823, to a new joint seat authorized by 3 Stat. 774. His service terminated on April 23, 1824, due to his death in New Orleans.

References

Sources
 

1788 births
1824 deaths
Irish emigrants to the United States (before 1923)
Judges of the United States District Court for the District of Louisiana
Judges of the United States District Court for the Western District of Louisiana
Judges of the United States District Court for the Eastern District of Louisiana
United States federal judges appointed by James Monroe
19th-century American judges
19th-century American politicians
United States federal judges admitted to the practice of law by reading law
United States Attorneys for the Western District of Louisiana